Chania Kladissos Indoor Hall (alternate spellings: Hania, Kladisos) (Greek: Κλειστό Κλαδισού Χανίων) is a multi-purpose indoor sports arena that is located in Chania, on the island of Crete, Greece. The arena is mainly used to host basketball, volleyball, and handball games. The arena has a seating capacity of 3,000 people for basketball games, with 2,400 seats being in the permanent upper tier, and 600 seats being in the retractable lower tier.

The arena also contains a practice facility, and a weight training room.

History
Chania Kladissos Indoor Hall was opened in 2005. The arena hosted the 2014 men's basketball HEBA Greek All Star Game. It also hosted the first round of the 2017 FIBA Europe Under-20 Championship.

References

External links
Information on the arena @ Stadia.gr
Image of Chania Kladissos Indoor Hall's Exterior
Image of Chania Kladissos Indoor Hall's Interior
Video of Chania Kladissos Indoor Hall during 2014 Greek All Star Game 

Basketball venues in Greece
Handball venues in Greece
Indoor arenas in Greece
Volleyball venues in Greece
Badminton venues